Islamabad–Muzaffarabad Branch Line is one of several railway lines in Pakistan proposed by Pakistan Railways. The proposed  line begins at Nur station on the Karachi–Peshawar Railway Line and will end at Muzaffarabad in Azad Jammu & Kashmir.

History
Construction on the 128 kilometre railway line began in 1979, where the new branch line diverged from the Karachi–Peshawar Railway Line at Nur station. The line then headed in an eastern direction towards sector I-9 in Islamabad where Islamabad railway station was constructed. Following the line reaching Islamabad, work was suspended in 1980. In April 2016, the Ministry of Railways began a feasibility study to restart construction of the line. Pending completion, planning and pre-construction design work, the project will be ready to go ahead pending market interest and planning approval. The extension of the line will continue in a northeast direction from Islamabad towards Murree and Bhurban before turning north and running parallel with the Jhelum River. At Kohala, the line would cross over the Jhelum River into Azad Jammu & Kashmir and continue north to Muzaffarabad.

Stations
Active Line
 Rawalpindi
 Nur
 Islamabad

Proposed Line
 Bhara Kahu
 Samblan
 Khajut
 Murree
 Bhurban
 Dewal Shareef
 Birote
 Kohala
 Muzaffarabad

See also
 Karachi–Peshawar Railway Line
 Railway lines in Pakistan

References

5 ft 6 in gauge railways in Pakistan